Stefanie Martini (born 6 October 1990) is an English actress, known for her leading role in ITV's 2017 production Prime Suspect 1973. She also starred in Doctor Thorne (2016), Emerald City (2017), the 2017 film Crooked House and the TV series The Last Kingdom.

Early life and education
Born in Bristol, Martini was raised in villages in North Somerset by her parents. She completed her secondary education locally. Having starred in local youth plays with Winscombe Youth Theatre and undertaken the two week induction at the National Youth Theatre, with an interest in illustration post A Levels at Churchill Academy and Sixth Form, she began an arts foundation course. However, a teacher suggested that if she was interested in acting, then she should try it.

After failing to get into RADA on her first attempt, Martini joined a one-year programme at the Bristol Old Vic Theatre School, where the company wrote their own plays that they produced in local schools. She was subsequently accepted into RADA the following year.

Career
During Martini's third year at RADA, she played the supporting role of a suspect in an episode of the TV series Endeavour. In 2016, she starred as Mary Thorne in Doctor Thorne, and Princess Langwidere in NBC's Emerald City. Martini portrayed the lead role of Jane Tennison in ITV's 2017 production Prime Suspect 1973 (also known as Prime Suspect: Tennison), a prequel to the well-known TV series that had starred Helen Mirren. She also played Sophia de Haviland in the 2017 film Crooked House, an adaptation of the Agatha Christie novel of the same name.

Personal life 
On 26 June 2021, Martini came out as bisexual in an Instagram post. Since late 2021, Martini has been in a relationship with English Intimacy Coordinator/model El Wood, which she announced publicly on social media on the 1st of January 2022.

Filmography

Film

Television

Awards and nominations

References

External links
 

Living people
1990 births
21st-century British actresses
Bisexual actresses
English people of Italian descent
English LGBT actors
People from North Somerset (district)
Actresses from Bristol